The Vancouver Shipyard was an emergency shipyard constructed along the Columbia River in Vancouver, Washington, to help meet the production demands of the U.S. Maritime Commission in World War II. The shipyard was one of three Kaiser Shipyards in the Pacific Northwest, along with the Oregon Shipbuilding Corporation and the Swan Island Shipyard across the Columbia in Portland, Oregon. It produced vessels of five different types, with Casablanca-class escort carriers being its biggest production line.

With an initial payroll of 38,000 workers, the nearby city of Vanport, Oregon was constructed to house the workforce that was introduced to the area.

The Shipyards were eventually sold to Gilmore Steel for $3.25 million.

References

External links
 

1942 establishments in Washington (state)
1940s disestablishments in Washington (state)

Economy of Vancouver, Washington
Maritime history of Washington (state)
Shipbuilding in Washington (state)
Henry J. Kaiser
United States home front during World War II
Shipyards of the United States